Ryan Day may refer to:

 Ryan Day (American football), head football coach at the Ohio State University
 Ryan Day (musician), past member of the Welsh band Attack! Attack!
 Ryan Day (snooker player), Welsh professional snooker player